Anne Berit Eid (born 13 June 1957) is a Norwegian orienteering competitor. She won the 1978 Individual World Orienteering Championships. She also won a silver medal in the relay at the 1979 World Orienteering Championships.

References

1957 births
Living people
Norwegian orienteers
Female orienteers
Foot orienteers
World Orienteering Championships medalists